Statistics of Mexican Primera División in season 1987–88.

Overview
It was contested by 20 teams, and América won the championship.

Correcaminos UAT was promoted from Segunda División.

Teams

Moves
After the season Correcaminos bought the Deportivo Neza franchise in order to remain in Primera División.

Ángeles was sold and transferred to Torreón and was made into Santos.

Group stage

Group 1

Group 2

Group 3

Group 4

Results

Playoff

References
Mexico - List of final tables (RSSSF)

Liga MX seasons
Mex
1987–88 in Mexican football